The Parnassiinae or snow Apollos are a subfamily of the swallowtail butterfly family, Papilionidae. 
The subfamily includes about 50 medium-sized, white or yellow species.  The snow Apollos are high-altitude butterflies and are distributed across Asia, Europe and North America.

Tribes

This subfamily consists of the following tribes:

 Luehdorfiini
 Parnassiini
 Zerynthiini

Gallery

References

Further reading
 Glassberg, Jeffrey Butterflies through Binoculars, The West (2001)
 Guppy, Crispin S. and Shepard, Jon H. Butterflies of British Columbia (2001)
 James, David G. and Nunnallee, David Life Histories of Cascadia Butterflies (2011)
 Pelham, Jonathan Catalogue of the Butterflies of the United States and Canada (2008)
 Pyle, Robert Michael The Butterflies of Cascadia (2002)

External links

 Tree of Life Parnassiinae
 Fauna Europaea
 Parnassius gallery
 Butterflies and Moths of North America
 Butterflies of America

Papilionidae
Butterfly subfamilies